The De Bruijn–Erdős theorem may refer to:
 De Bruijn–Erdős theorem (incidence geometry)
 De Bruijn–Erdős theorem (graph theory)